John Mickleburgh (c. 1692 – 11 May 1756) was an English chemist, and the third holder of the 1702 Chair of Chemistry at the University of Cambridge.

Early life 
Mickleburgh was born in Norwich, the son of Thomas Mickleburgh, a weaver.

Academic career
At age 17, on 30 May 1709, Mickleburgh was admitted a sizar at Caius, Cambridge. Shortly after he migrated to Corpus Christi, Cambridge, where he was made a Fellow in 1714. He secured the 1702 Chair of Chemistry in 1718, which he occupied until his death in 1756.

Among his students were John Morgan, Professor of Anatomy at Cambridge from 1728 to 1734, and his two immediate successors, George Cuthbert and Robert Bankes.

References

1756 deaths
18th-century English scientists
English chemists
Alumni of Corpus Christi College, Cambridge
Fellows of Corpus Christi College, Cambridge
Members of the University of Cambridge Department of Chemistry
Scientists from Norwich
Year of birth uncertain
Professors of chemistry (Cambridge, 1702)